Syd Barrett was an English singer, songwriter, musician and painter who co-founded the rock band Pink Floyd in 1965. He was known to be reclusive. Reclusiveness may coincide with mental disorders and some persons may have speculative diagnoses of schizophrenia (see List of people with schizophrenia), but  this does not mean that Barrett's songs, and the songs about him, concern reclusion: for example, the instrumental "Interstellar Overdrive" exemplify Pink Floyd's early psychedelic period.

Barrett left Pink Floyd less than a year after the release of their first single, "Arnold Layne". He played with the band only on their first two albums (The Piper at the Gates of Dawn), contributing Jugband Blues as the closing track on A Saucerful of Secrets, before recording two albums in 1970 (The Madcap Laughs and Barrett), the latter of which failed to chart. In 1975 the Pink Floyd album Wish You Were Here became a popular screed against music business with its theme the loss of Barrett.

With the decline of the record industry and changes in the music business, Barrett's alienation remains relevant. The following list is indicative of Barrett's legacy.

Songs

Other songs
The above list may be incomplete, and subtle references may be found in songs not included above, especially Pink Floyd songs such as "Fearless", which would be more explicit in "Brain Damage" and songs in The Wall such as "Hey You" and "Nobody Home". Some claimed Barrett references turn out to be spurious. The Shamen credit their song "It's All Around" to Barrett and some bands, like Jennifer Gentle, are named after Barrett songs (in this case, from a line in "Lucifer Sam"); two bands are known as Baby Lemonade. Italian band Birdy Hop is named after a Syd Barrett song; the title of their debut album, Welcome To The Insanity Ride, recalls a line from "Octopus" and producer and singer-songwriter Amerigo Verardi has been compared to Barrett. Los Prisioneros's "Concepción" mentions Barrett in the chorus, referencing the rumors about him living in Chiguayante, and how supposedly the 2 cities he ever made a concert in were London and Concepción.

Edgar Froese and Tangerine Dream recorded a tribute album to Syd Barrett, Madcap's Flaming Duty in 2007.

Cover versions of Barrett songs
Of the many cover versions of Syd Barrett songs, the best-known are David Bowie's 1973 "See Emily Play", The Jesus and Mary Chain's 1984 "Vegetable Man", R.E.M.'s 1989  "Dark Globe" and the Smashing Pumpkins' 1991 "Terrapin".

Internet songs
Sharing and streaming over the Internet has resulted in a number of unreleased Barrett tributes, including the 1999 mp3 "Elephant" by Rex Tangle on his website, the 2000 instrumental MP3 "A Tribute to Syd" by The Worms on disc 18 of Have You Got It Yet?, a 2007 video of "There's A Man In Cambridge (Song for Syd Barrett)" by "Alec" on YouTube, and a 2007 parody cover video ("Pink Floyd – Paying The Piper") by "Pauldullson", also on YouTube.

Notes
The following are references cited in order to link to explanatory information. The references not cited in specific parts of the article are in the External links section at the bottom of the page. The other sources are in the next section.

References
Where not otherwise specified, the retrieved dates in the reference section are assumed to be 28 March 2014.

External links
Is rock music dead? opinions at Debate.org
Other Pink Floyd Related Albums overview at The Pink Floyd HyperBase
https://web.archive.org/web/20160303232648/http://www.psychemusic.org/prog7.html Inspired By Syd Barrett & Pink Floyd: review page] at  
Syd Barrett Tributes from Bowie, Robyn Hitchcock, Wayne Coyne and More at The Future Heart